Simon Sundström (born 4 February 1998) is a Swedish athlete who competes in the steeplechase.

Sundström participated in the 2,000m steeplechase in July 2015 at the Youth World Championships in Cali, Colombia. 

At the junior European Championships in Grosseto, Italy in 2017, Sundström participated in the 3,000m steeplechase and finished in sixth place overall.

In 2019, Simon Sundström ran the 3,000m steeplechase at the U23 European Championships in Gävle. He won his trial heat and took a bronze medal in the final.

He won the 3000m at the 2020 Nordic Indoor Athletics Match.

References

1998 births
Living people
Swedish male steeplechase runners
Athletes (track and field) at the 2020 Summer Olympics
Olympic athletes of Sweden